Hypolamprus emblicalis is a species of moth of the family Thyrididae. It is found in India and Taiwan.

References

Moths described in 1888
Thyrididae